Eduard Schmieder (born 2 May 1948 in Lviv, Soviet Union) is a violinist, teacher and conductor. He is a highly regarded violin pedagogue. Yehudi Menuhin said, "Eduard Schmieder is one of the outstanding teachers of the violin. I have the highest admiration for his work, his dedication, and his integrity."  He currently holds the position of Distinguished Professor of Violin at the Boyer College of Music and Dance, Philadelphia, Temple University where he is an Artistic Director for Strings. Prior to that appointment, he was Distinguished Algur H. Meadows Chair of Violin and Chamber Music in the Meadows School of the Arts in Dallas (1990–2006), and tenured professor of the violin at the University of Southern California, a position formerly held by Jascha Heifetz.  His other tenured teaching appointments were at Shepherd School of Music, Rice University, Houston (1982–1986), and Lamar University, Beaumont (1980–1984). Eduard Schmieder immigrated to the United States from USSR in 1979.   From 1980 to the present, many featured articles and reviews on his teaching and performances have been written in publications nationwide and internationally.

He has taught master classes in virtually every foremost conservatory in the world, and performs, teaches, and conducts at international music festivals. In the United States he has worked in music festivals at Aspen, Interlochen, Musicorda, Idyllwild, and in New York. In 2004, he has joined the summer faculty at the prestigious Mozarteum Summer Academie Salzburg.

Eduard Schmieder founded the iPalpiti Orchestral Ensemble of International Laureates in 1991 in Dallas, and has conducted it in major halls, with residences in the Netherlands and Beverly Hills, California, culminating in sold-out concerts at the famed Concertgebouw (Amsterdam), Disney Hall (Los Angeles), Carnegie Hall (New York), European and Asian tours.

As a violinist and conductor he has collaborated with such musicians as Ida Haendel, Yehudi Menuhin, Brooks Smith, Nathaniel Rosen, Erick Friedman, Tsuyoshi Tsutsumi, and many others. In 1996, Eduard Schmieder performed a recital in Genoa on Paganini's treasured Guarneri del Gesu Il Cannone violin.

Violin students in performance and competitions

Students of Professor Schmieder maintain careers as soloists, chamber musicians and leaders in major orchestras: Tim Fain USA, Catherine Leonard, Pavel Sporcl, Boris Brovtsyn, Dmitri Makhtin, Alexandru Tomescu, Xiao Xiao Cao, Sayako Kusaka, Vadim Tchijik, Catharina Chen and Pieter Schoeman

Professor Schmieder frequently represents the United States as a jury member at leading international violin competitions including:
 Queen Elisabeth International Violin Competition, Belgium (1997)
 Jean Sibelius International Violin Competition, Finland (1990, 2000)
 Georges Enescu International Violin Competitions(2016,2018,2020)
 ARD International Violin Competition, Germany (1992, 2001)
 Leopold Mozart International Violin Competition, Germany (2003, 2006, 2009)
 Premio Paganini, Genoa, Italy (1995, 2000)
 Premio Rodolfo Lipizer Premio Rodolfo Lipizer, Gorizia, Italy (2003)
 International Violin Competition, Sinaia, Romania – President of the Jury (biannual since 2002-2019)
 UNISA (1988,1992)
 Pablo de Sarasate International Violin Competition, Spain (2001, 2008)
 Postacchini International Violin Competition, Fermo, Italy (2007,2014)
 International Spohr-Wettbewerb Competition, Weimar, Germany (2007, 2010)
2nd China International Violin Competition, Qingdao (November 2008)

References

Living people
Temple University faculty
Texas classical music
1948 births
Aspen Music Festival and School faculty
Rice University faculty
Lamar University people
USC Thornton School of Music faculty
Soviet emigrants to the United States